Hypercompe muzina is a moth of the family Erebidae first described by Charles Oberthür in 1881. It is found from Texas and Mexico to Brazil and Colombia.

The larvae have been recorded feeding on Theobroma cacao.

References

Hypercompe
Moths described in 1881